The following lists events during 2016 in Hong Kong.

Incumbents
 Chief Executive - Leung Chun-ying

Events

January 
 The suspected local abduction of a Hong Kong citizen by mainland Chinese law enforcement brought to light a series of disappearances relating to a book selling and publishing business in Hong Kong, triggering an international political scandal for the CY Leung administration and for the Chinese Communist Party.

February 
Civil unrest in Mong Kok occurred on the night of 8 February 2016, lasting until the next morning. The incident escalated from the government's crackdown on unlicensed street hawkers during the Chinese New Year holidays, and resulted in the worst outbreak of street violence since the 1960s.
The New Territories East by-election was held to elect a replacement for legislative councillor Ronny Tong Ka-wah of New Territories East constituency who quit the Civic Party and resigned from the Legislative Council of Hong Kong (LegCo), effective on 1 October 2015. Alvin Yeung of the Civic Party was duly elected.

April
 1 April - Asia Television shuts down.

September
 4 September - 2016 Hong Kong legislative election

November
 15 November - Baggio Leung and Yau Wai-ching were disqualified from LegCo membership.

December
 9 December - Leung Chun-ying declared to not run for Chief Executive in 2017.

Deaths

March
 19 March - Wong Lam, 96, Hong Kong politician, unofficial member of the Legislative Council of Hong Kong (1976–1985).
 24 March - Mae-Wan Ho, 74, Hong Kong geneticist.

April
 1 April - Alan Carter, 86, British civil servant, Director of Immigration of Hong Kong (1983–1989).

May
 27 May - Bonnie Law, 47, Hong Kong singer and actress (Happy Ghost), heart attack.

September
 29 September - Cheng Yu-tung, 91, Hong Kong businessman (Chow Tai Fook).

October
 4 October - Bing Thom, 75, Hong Kong-born Canadian architect, brain aneurysm.
 16 October
 Jia Jia, 38, Chinese giant panda, euthanized.
 Geoffrey Yeh, 85, Hong Kong businessman.

November
 3 November - Xia Meng, 84, Hong Kong actress.
 24 November - Matthew Chan, 69, Hong Kong Olympic fencer (1972, 1976), cancer.

December
 7 December - Hui Yin-fat, 80, Hong Kong social worker and politician, MLC (1985–1995), MEC (1991–1992) and member of the PLC (1996–1998).

See also
 List of Hong Kong films of 2016

References

 
Years of the 21st century in Hong Kong
Hong Kong
Hong Kong